Franz-Josef Hagmanns-Dajka (born 1958 in Tüddern, Netherlands, now Germany), known professionally as Funny van Dannen, is a German singer, songwriter, author, and painter of Dutch origin.

He sings about politics, society, sexuality, religion, and many other topics, usually humorously. He accompanies his songs with guitar, sometimes with harmonica. He founded the band Lassie Singers. Since 1978 he has lived in Berlin. He is married and has four sons.

The punk band Die Toten Hosen interpreted some of his songs, notably Trauriges Arschloch, Bayern, Frauen dieser Welt, and Lesbische, schwarze Behinderte.
Die Schröders, another punk rock band, made his song "Saufen" more famous.

Discography

 Clubsongs (1995)
 Basics (1996)
 Info3 (1997)
 Uruguay (1999)
 Melody Star (2000)
 Groooveman (2002)
 Herzscheiße (2003)
 Nebelmaschine (2005)
 Authentic Trip (2005)
 Trotzdem danke (2007)
 Saharasand (2009)
 Fischsuppe (2012)
 Geile Welt (2014)
 Come On (Live im Lido) (2016)
 Alles gut, Motherfucker (2018)
 Kolossale Gegenwart (2022)

Books
 Spurt ins Glück (1991)
 Jubel des Lebens (1993)
 Am Wegesrand (1996)
 Komm in meine Arme (1998)
 Der Tag als Rosi kam (1997)
 Neues von Gott (2004)
 Zurück im Paradies (2007)
 An der Grenze zur Realität (2015)
 Die weitreichenden Folgen des Fleischkonsums (2018)

References

External links

 Official website (in German)

1958 births
Living people
German male musicians